Rusk is a city and the county seat of Cherokee County in the U.S. state of Texas. At the 2020 United States census, it had a population of 5,285.

History
The town was established by an act of the Texas Legislature on April 11, 1846. It was named after Thomas Jefferson Rusk, signer of the Texas Declaration of Independence. By 1850, Rusk reportedly had 355 residents. A post office was authorized on March 8, 1847.

The city of Rusk is no longer dry; a beer and wine local option election passed on May 9, 2009. Three years later, in 2012, another local option election was held, to consider liquor sales. It also passed.

Geography

Rusk is crossed by U.S. Routes 69 and 84. US 69 leads northwest  to Jacksonville, the largest city in Cherokee County, and southeast  to Lufkin, while US 84 leads east  to Mount Enterprise and west the same distance to Palestine.

Rusk is underlain by glauconite-rich sediments which, in most parts of town, have weathered to dark reddish brown fine sandy loam topsoil over dark red clay subsoil characteristic of the Nacogdoches soil series.

Climate
The climate in this area is characterized by hot, humid summers and generally mild to cool winters.  According to the Köppen Climate Classification system, Rusk has a humid subtropical climate, abbreviated "Cfa" on climate maps.

Demographics

As of the 2020 United States census, there were 5,285 people, 1,210 households, and 866 families residing in the city.

At the 2010 U.S. census, there were 5,551 people, 1,306 households, and 867 families residing in the city. The population density was 745.4 people per square mile (287.9/km2). There were 1,539 housing units at an average density of 225.6 per square mile (87.1/km2). The racial makeup of the city was 62.71% White, 30.01% African American, 0.18% Native American, 0.96% Asian, 5.15% from other races, and 0.98% from two or more races. Hispanic or Latino of any race were 6.92% of the population. By 2020, the U.S. Census Bureau tabulated a population of 5,285 with a predominantly non-Hispanic white population.

In 2010 there were 1,306 households, out of which 32.3% had children under the age of 18 living with them, 45.6% were married couples living together, 17.5% had a female householder with no husband present, and 33.6% were non-families. 30.9% of all households were made up of individuals, and 16.0% had someone living alone who was 65 years of age or older. The average household size was 2.44 and the average family size was 3.05. In the city, the population was spread out, with 17.3% under the age of 18, 8.9% from 18 to 24, 39.3% from 25 to 44, 20.6% from 45 to 64, and 13.9% who were 65 years of age or older. The median age was 38 years. For every 100 females, there were 154.6 males. For every 100 females age 18 and over, there were 168.4 males.

The median income for a household in the city was $27,370, and the median income for a family was $33,952. Males had a median income of $24,271 versus $22,438 for females. The per capita income for the city was $11,688. About 16.2% of families and 21.5% of the population were below the poverty line, including 29.4% of those under age 18 and 21.0% of those age 65 or over. At the 2020 American Community Survey, the median household income increased to $48,235 with a mean income of $63,832.

Parks and recreation

Jim Hogg Park and Rusk State Park are in Rusk.

The longest footbridge in the nation and the longest zip line in Texas are located in Rusk.

The Texas State Railroad operates between Rusk and Palestine.

The Heritage Center of Cherokee County & Cherokee Civic Theater are located in Rusk.

Education
The city of Rusk and surrounding rural areas are served by the Rusk Independent School District.

Infrastructure

Postal service
The United States Postal Service operates the Rusk Post Office.

Rusk State Hospital
The Texas Department of State Health Services operates the Rusk State Hospital in Rusk. At that site, the Texas Prison System previously operated the Rusk Penitentiary.

Notable people
Rusk has been home to three former governors, James Stephen Hogg, Thomas M. Campbell,  and John B. Kendrick (Governor of Wyoming). Rusk has also been the home to Jim Swink, Adrian Burk and Johnny Horton.
 
Anthony Denman, former Notre Dame All American, Most Valuable Player and former NFL player, is from Rusk. He was the first to hail from Rusk to play in the NFL.

Cody Glenn, a former Nebraska standout and former NFL player, is from Rusk.

MLB player Chris James was born in Rusk.

References

External links

 City of Rusk official website
 Rusk Chamber of Commerce
 Rusk, Texas at Handbook of Texas

Cities in Cherokee County, Texas
Cities in Texas
County seats in Texas
1846 establishments in Texas
Populated places established in 1846